The 1992 Tide Trans-Am Tour was the 27th season of the Sports Car Club of America's Trans-Am Series.

Results

Championships

Driver (Top 10)

Manufacturers
Chevrolet – 91 points
Ford – 50 points
Dodge – 48 points

References

Trans-Am Series
1992 in American motorsport